Series 24 of Top Gear, a British motoring magazine and factual television programme, was broadcast in the United Kingdom on BBC Two during 2017, consisting of seven episodes between 5 March and 23 April; due to the BBC's live coverage of  the Masters Tournament on 9 April, the series took a break between its fifth and sixth episodes. This series' highlights included road trip across Kazakhstan in high-mileage cars, a race between a car and several high-value forms of transportation, and the presenters converting a car into a yacht.

Following the negative feedback on the previous series, and the departure of Chris Evans a day after its conclusion, production staff decided on the remaining presenter Matt LeBlanc being joined by Chris Harris and Rory Reid as his co-hosts full time, with occasional appearances by both Sabine Schmitz and Eddie Jordan. To improve the programme's viewing figures, staff opted for a revamp of Top Gears studio, logo and opening titles, while restoring its celebrity segment to its previous format, but with minor changes to the name and style when they opted for the use of a fast car.

Production
Following the mixed to negative feedback for the previous series from critics and viewers, and the resignation of Chris Evans, the show underwent a revamp, with the creation of a brand new studio, complete with new seats, a racing tyre designed table and new screens, along with a brand new logo design and opening titles. In addition, along with continuing to host BBC Three companion show, Extra Gear, the BBC decided to reassign both Chris Harris and Rory Reid as Top Gears main hosts alongside Matt LeBlanc. In February 2017, it was confirmed that comedian George Lewis would be joining the spin-off programme as a presenter alongside Harris and Reid. It was also announced that the format of the Star in a Reasonably Priced Car segment would return for Series 24, after the BBC dropped the controversial Star in a Rally-Cross Car segment that had replaced it due to the negative feedback it received. As the previous car for the segment, the Vauxhall Astra Tech Line, had been sent back to Vauxhall and auctioned off for charity, a brand new car was provided for the segment, the Toyota GT86, leading to the segment being renamed as Star in a Reasonably Fast Car.

Marketing
On 4 February 2017, BBC Two began showcasing trailers for the new series, with the caption "Top Gear: Coming Soon". On 24 February, Top Gear's official Twitter page confirmed that the twenty-fourth series would premiere on 5 March 2017, broadcasting seven weekly episodes.

Episodes

References 

Top Gear seasons
2017 British television seasons